Nagabhushanam may refer to:
 Nagabhushanam (actor), in Telugu cinema
 T. D. J. Nagabhushanam, agriculturalist
 Nagabhushan Rao Machiraju, American-based CEO
 Kadaru Nagabhushanam, (1902–1976), Indian film director and producer